The Yemen national under-17 football team represents Yemen in international under-17 football competitions and is controlled by the Yemen Football Association.

Tournament Records

FIFA U-17 World Cup

AFC U-16 Championship

1Yemen were ejected from the 2008 AFC U-16 Championship competition for fielding an overage player, Wesam Saleh Al-Worafi.

Arab Cup U-17

Recent results and forthcoming fixtures

Players

Current squad
The following players were called up for the 2020 AFC U-16 Championship qualification.

Head coach: Mohammed Al Nufiay

Coaching staff

Golden generation

Golden generation (Elected hope) who participated in 2003 FIFA U-17 World Championship In Finland

Former squads
2003 FIFA U-17 World Championship squads

See also
 Yemen national football team
 Yemen national under-20 football team
 Yemen national under-23 football team

References

under-17
Asian national under-17 association football teams